Vicia popovii is a species of flowering plant in the vetch genus Vicia, family Fabaceae, native to Chita and Amur Oblasts of Russia. It is a climber.

References

popovii
Endemic flora of Russia 
Flora of Chita Oblast
Flora of Amur Oblast
Plants described in 1985